General Mariano Alvarez, officially the Municipality of General Mariano Alvarez and often shortened as GMA, is a 1st class municipality in the province of Cavite, Philippines. According to the 2020 census, it has a population of 172,433 people.

With an area of just , it is the second most densely populated municipality in Cavite after Rosario.

Etymology
The municipality was named after General Mariano Álvarez, a native of the town of Noveleta, Cavite.

History

General Mariano Alvarez was formerly a part of Carmona, Cavite.  The province's third planned community was previously called Carmona Resettlement Project and was under the direct management of the People's Homesite and Housing Corporation (PHHC). The project started in March 1968 because of the need to clear the Quezon Memorial Park, Diliman, Quezon City of different shanties and other illegal constructions built on it. By 1974, the project lots became part of the full-fledged communities of poor and middle class residents coming from Quezon City, Manila, Makati and Parañaque.

Due to the popular clamor of the residents of the aforementioned resettlement areas towards the conversion of their locality into an independent municipality, the ten (10) Barangay Council of the communities of the then San Gabriel and San Jose, submitted resolution expressing their desire to the Sangguniang Bayan of Carmona which in turn favorably endorsed the idea through Resolutions No. 56-S-1978. By 1979, the idea soon began to speed up as the provincial deputy to the Interim Batasang Pambansa, Helena Benitez, and MP for Eastern Visayas and concurrent Minister of Local Government, Jose Roño, pursued the separation of the growing communities, whose several of their residents were now working in the growing industrial factories in Carmona town and in other parts of the province, as well as in agriculture and small enterprises.

The municipality was chartered through Batas Pambansa Blg. 75, on June 13, 1980. Proclamation No. 2033, signed on November 11, 1980, set the plebiscite on January 10, 1981. The ratification by the majority votes cast in a plebiscite at Carmona and its duly constituted barangays and President Ferdinand Marcos appointed the first set of local officials of General Mariano Alvarez. Its proportional share in the obligation of funds, assets and other properties of Carmona was transferred to the newly created municipality upon the recommendation of the Commission of Audit, which was approved on June 30, 1980. The new municipality's first officials were officially inaugurated on March 14, 1981.

The new town, for the next few years, was composed of the Resettlement areas of Barangays San Jose, San Gabriel and a portion of Cabilang Baybay. Barangay San Jose consisted of areas A and B while Barangay San Gabriel consisted of Areas C, D, E, F, G, H, I, J, and K.

In 2006, the municipality celebrated its 25th anniversary with a line-up of activities participated in by the municipality's residents. Gen. Mariano Alvarez also takes pride in being known as the “Mushroom Capital of Cavite” because of the mushroom culture facilities in the town. Mushrooms have become the town's main product in line with the “One Town, One Product” program of the Philippine national government.

Geography
General Mariano Alvarez lies at the north-eastern boundaries of Cavite with Laguna. It is bounded to the north by San Pedro, Laguna, to the east by Carmona, to the west by Dasmariñas and to the south by Silang.

Land area
General Mariano Alvarez has a total land area of 938.0137 hectares more or less as per Batasang Pambansa Bilang 76 dated June 13, 1980, which created the municipality. These areas are currently occupied by 27 barangays of which five are considered Poblacion barangays and 22 others are regular barangays.

Topography
The municipality has elongated shape with a north, north-eastern orientation. It has a total length of about 7,040 meters and a width of about 780 meters at its smallest and 1,720 meters at its widest. The terrain is relatively flat plain from the south starting at the Governor's Drive running north covering about one third of the municipality's length at Poblacion 5. From this point the terrain gradually begin to gently slope in one direction in the middle portion of the municipality, undulating and rolling to more than one direction towards the north-eastern barangay of Epifanio Malia, portion of Francisco de Castro, Francisco Reyes and San Jose.

Inland water bodies serve as natural boundaries with neighboring municipalities and drain its surface waters towards Manila Bay and Laguna Bay. These are Embarcadero River on the western boundaries with Dasmariñas and San Gabriel River on the eastern boundaries with Carmona. A major tributary, of San Gabriel River traverse the inner areas of the municipality from Francisco de Castro and Southwoods to Jacinto Lumbreras. The same tributary branches out at Inocencio Salud to serve as boundaries between the barangay of Col. J.P Elises and Aldiano Olaes, on the eastern side. Small streams crisscross the landscape forming natural drainage where waste drains from Manila Bay and Laguna de Bay. These water bodies run and form deep gullies which gave the land a mass ridge-like formation. Considering the height and mass of the water bodies, the ridge-like formation are highly elevated. Thus, the terrain as described above.

Man-made physical changes, includes the presence of the Congressional Road which stretcher on full length of the municipality from the Governor's Drive or the national highway in the south to Francisco de Castro on the north. It runs parallel to the water bodies mentioned above on the eastern side of the municipality. Structures such as houses, schools, commercial establishments, institutional buildings and industrial firms are located among this road, on gully sides of water bodies and the top flat plain areas of the ridge. Open grasslands and agricultural areas can be found on the western near central portion of the municipality.

Slope
The slope of the municipality ranges from 0-3% to 3-8% broad to level nearly level are classified under 0-3% slope. These are generally the flat plain level lands on the southern portion from the Governor's Drive extending inwards covering all Poblacion barangays, Gavino Maderan, Jacinto Lumbreras, Ramon Cruz, San Gabriel and Severino delas Alas, 3-5% slope are gently sloping areas with land sloping in one general direction. This areas compress the central portion of the municipality from Barangay Kapitan Kua, Pantaleon Granados and Marcelino Mimeje to Aldiano Olaes, Col. Jose P. Elises and portion of Foerillo Calimag, Macario Dacon and Benjamin Tirona. These also include Inocencio Salud and Bernardo Pulido.

Areas on the north and north-eastern side have slope of 5-8%. These are gently undulating and rolling lands sloping in more than one general direction. Portion of Baranay Feorillo Calimag, Macario Dacon and Benjamin Tirona and barangay of Francisco de Castro, Francisco Reyes, Epifanio Malia, Tiniente Tiago, Nicolasa Virata, Gregoria de Jesus and San Jose.

Climate

Barangays
General Mariano Alvarez is currently divided into 27 barangays. Five of the current barangays are classified as poblacion barangays, or those that are within the municipality's central area. The 22 others are ordinary barangays.

The 27 barangays are as follows:

These Barangays were created out of the former residential areas in 1985. Except for the town proper, many are named after the first area barangay captains and people connected to the life and work of General Alvarez.

Demographics

Religion
The majority of the inhabitants are Roman Catholics and Protestants. There are some such as: Iglesia Ni Cristo, United Pentecostal Church Int'l., Apostolic Church of Jesus Christ Phils. Inc., Family Tabernacle of Jesus Christ Int'l. , Members Church of God International, Seventh Day Adventist and many others.

Economy

Healthcare 
General Mariano Alvarez has two hospitals: San Jose Hospital & Trauma Center and GMA Medicare Hospital.

Government

List of local chief executives
Leoniso G. Virata (1981–1986; 1988–1998)
Tomas E. Abueg (officer-in-charge, 1986–1987)
Severino P. Tamala (officer-in-charge, 1987–1988)
Antonio G. Virata (1998–2001)
Walter D. Echevarria, Jr. (2001–2010; 2013–2021)
Leonisa Joana B. Virata (2010–2013)
Maricel E. Torres (officer-in-charge, 2020–2021), (assumed office, August 3, 2021–present)

References

Fontanilla, M. et al. (2001). Comprehensive Land Use Plan of the Municipality of Gen. Mariano Alvarez, Cavite.  (Unpublished report.) Cavite: Municipal Government of Gen. Mariano Alvarez.
Commission on Elections (October 30, 2007). List of Winning Candidates in the October 29, 2007, Synchronized Barangay and Sangguniang Kabataan Elections. (Unpublished report._ Cavite: Office of the Election Officer, COMELEC-Gen. Mariano Alvarez.

External links

Official Website of the Provincial Government of Cavite
Philippine Census Information

Municipalities of Cavite